Love to Make Music To is a studio album by American electronic music producer Daedelus. It was released on Ninja Tune in 2008.

Critical reception
Michael Slevin of The Skinny gave the album 4 stars out of 5, saying: "The songs on this album are eclectic yet symbiotic, with breakbeat convoluting with jaunty showtunes in one corner, and low key electro-tinged hip-hop flirting with dancey pseudo-jazz numbers in the other." Tim Sendra of AllMusic gave the album 4 stars out of 5, saying, "Love to Make Music To may not be the best Daedelus album, but it's not far from it -- and that makes it just about the best electronic pop you are likely to hear in 2008." Colin Buttimer of BBC called it "an enjoyably varied album, full of texture, emotion and playful ideas."

Track listing

Personnel
Credits adapted from liner notes.

 Daedelus – instruments, artwork
 Michael Johnson – guitar (1), synthesizer (1), vocals (6)
 Paperboy – vocals (2, 5)
 Taz Arnold – vocals (2, 11)
 N'fa – vocals (3)
 Erika Rose – vocals (5)
 Ben Wendel – Rhodes piano (10), digital horn (10)
 Laura Darlington – vocals (13)
 Om'Mas Keith – vocals (15)
 Daddy Kev – mixing, mastering
 Sasha Barr – artwork

References

Further reading

External links
 

2008 albums
Daedelus (musician) albums
Ninja Tune albums